Globus Medical, Inc. is a publicly traded medical device company headquartered in Audubon, Pennsylvania, United States. Globus is focused on the design, development, and commercialization of products that enable surgeons to promote healing in patients with musculoskeletal disorders.

Products
Globus develops, manufactures, and markets orthopedic implants including spine, trauma, artificial joints.

Globus makes the ExcelsiusGPS surgical robotic system for spine surgery. The robot is used for transpedicular drilling and screw placement.

Acquisitions
In January 2014, Globus Medical acquired Excelsius Surgical. The Excelsius system is designed to integrate intra-operative digital imaging with a robotic surgery device to hold patients in place during surgeries "with sub-millimeter accuracy".

In October 2014, Globus Medical acquired allograft tissue processor Transplant Technologies of Texas, Ltd. (TTOT). TTOT is a provider of human tissue products including bone allografts, biomaterials, and soft tissue products for spine, orthopedics, sports medicine, dental, and wound care markets.

In February 2015, Globus Medical acquired Branch Medical Group, a third party manufacturer of high precision medical devices.

In July 2016, Globus Medical acquired Alphatec Holdings, an international operations and distribution channel, for  $80 million. As part of the transaction, Globus has agreed to provide Alphatec a five-year senior secured credit facility of up to $30 million.

In September 2018, Globus Medical acquired Nemaris, developers of Surgimap, a pre-operative planning software for spinal surgeons.

In August 2019, Globus Medical acquired privately-owned StelKast, manufacturer of implants and instruments for hip and knee replacement.

Controversies
In August 2007 Globus Medical settled a lawsuit initially filed by Synthes in 2004 over alleged stolen trade secrets. Former Synthes employees, who then worked for Globus, were accused of stealing 2300 electronic files containing blueprints for Synthes' products, safety-testing plans, and verbatim 510(k) filing documents. Globus paid Synthes $13.5 million and did not admit any wrongdoing.

In 2011, Synthes filed a second lawsuit against Globus Medical for infringing three patents, "asking the court to force the defendant to destroy its allegedly infringing products." Orthopedic Design & Technology Magazine reports that, "There was no finding of willful infringement in this lawsuit." A $16 million monetary damage was paid by Globus Medical in 2013.

References

External links
Official website

Medical technology companies of the United States
Health care companies based in Pennsylvania
Manufacturing companies based in Pennsylvania
Health care companies established in 2003
2003 establishments in Pennsylvania
Companies listed on the New York Stock Exchange